South Carolina Highway 296 (SC 296) is a  east–west state highway coursing through central Greenville and Spartanburg counties in the northwestern part of the U.S. state of South Carolina.

Route description
The west terminus of SC 296 is at a junction with SC 14 in west-central Greenville County and proceeds in a generally east-northeast direction. Shortly after the junction, the route merges with SC 146, but soon separates from SC 146 a short distance afterward. SC 296 then crosses into Spartanburg County as it traverses the Enoree River, and then intersects with SC 101 before passing through Reidville. Then, SC 296 intersects with SC 290 and SC 417 before intersecting with Interstate 26 (I-26) at exit 22 just outside the Spartanburg city limits. Within the city, SC 296 junctions with U.S. Route 29 (US 29) where the highway officially ends.

History

Major intersections

See also

References

External links

SC 296 at Virginia Highways' South Carolina Highways Annex

296
Transportation in Greenville County, South Carolina
Transportation in Spartanburg County, South Carolina